Lac du Baggersee is a lake in Bas-Rhin, France. The French name is a tautology as See already means lake in German.

References 

Baggersee
Landforms of Bas-Rhin